Danzan may refer to:

 Danzan-ryū, a jiujitsu school

Danzan is a Mongolian personal name.
Notable persons with this name include:
as proper name
 Soliin Danzan (1885–1924), Mongolian revolutionary and political leader,
 Ajvaagiin Danzan (1895–1932), Mongolian revolutionary and political leader.
as patronymic
 Danzangiin Narantungalag, a Mongolian olympic cross-country ski athlete
 Danzangiin Lundeejantsan, a Mongolian MP and former chairman of the parliament